Cornelius Scranton Bushnell (July 19, 1829 – May 6, 1896) was an American railroad executive and shipbuilder who was instrumental in developing ironclad ships for the Union Navy during the American Civil War.

Background
Bushnell, the son of Nathan & Chloe (Scranton) Bushnell, was born July 19, 1829, in Madison, Connecticut. At the age of 15, he decided to become a sailor and shipped out on a coastal vessel. Within a year and a half, he was master of a 60-ton schooner.  Later, he went into the grocery business with his brother.

Railroad
The bankrupt New Haven and New London Railroad offered new opportunities for him.  Working with friends and with his own capital, he invested in the railroad.  By 1860, under Bushnell's guidance, it had completed a critical connection with the Providence Road, which completed the connection between New York City and Boston. By 1861, Bushnell had been elected president of the railroad.

USS Monitor
Bushnell was in Washington, D.C., when the Civil War broke out.  At that time, he volunteered to defend the capital in a militia unit until regular troops could be moved in.  He mustered out on May 4, 1861, after the arrival of the 6th Massachusetts Infantry.

In mid-1861, the Confederates raised and began refitting a 3500-ton frigate, the USS Merrimac, that had been burned to the waterline by the Federals.  They began restoring the ship as an ironclad.  News of this caused great worry in Washington and the race was on to build Federal ironclads. With S. H. Pook of Boston, a naval expert, Bushnell and other officials soon developed plans for their own ironclad for the U.S. Navy, a vessel later known as the Galena.  Out of a concern for the stability of the proposed craft, Bushnell traveled to see Capt. John Ericsson for his analysis and opinion, which he agreed to provide.  But Ericsson also had his own plans and a working model of a unique floating battery, a low slung ironclad outfitted with a revolving turret.  This novel design was to revolutionize naval warfare.  An impressed Bushnell went back to Washington and, within eight days, the new design was approved by Navy officials and the Secretary of the Navy, Gideon Welles. Through Bushnell's efforts, the USS Monitor was rapidly completed and went on to fight the refurnibished Merrimac (by then known as the CSS Virginia) at Battle of Hampton Roads, saving the Union fleet of wooden sailing ships.

Submarine

Bushnell was also involved in the early development of a hand-crank powered submarine. the Intelligent Whale.  He disposed of his interest in the project before any actual attempts to deploy the vessel were made, however.

After the war
Following the Civil War, Bushnell returned to the railroad industry, and was one of the organizers of the Union Pacific Railroad.  He died in New York City.

The town of Bushnell, Nebraska is named after him.

Notes

References

 Bushnell, George Eleazer, Bushnell Family Genealogy, Ancestry and Posterity of FRANCIS BUSHNELL (1580–1646). Nashville, Tennessee: 1945. Bushnell biography
 CORNELIUS SCRANTON BUSHNELL on roots web, from Modern History of New Haven and Eastern New Haven County Cornelius S. Bushnell
 Cornelius S. Bushnell on Madison Historical Society website, https://www.madisonhistory.org/key-figures/c-s-bushnell/
 Cornelius Scranton Bushnell portrait https://www.flickr.com/photos/madisonhistory/21044977096/in/album-72157665143254011/

1829 births
1896 deaths
People from Madison, Connecticut
19th-century American railroad executives
Union Navy
People of Washington, D.C., in the American Civil War
Union Pacific Railroad people
American sailors